This was the first edition of the tournament.

Evan King and Reese Stalder won the title after defeating Marco Bortolotti and Sergio Martos Gornés 6–3, 5–7, [11–9] in the final.

Seeds

Draw

References

External links
 Main draw

Maspalomas Challenger - Doubles